The Tofus is an animated sitcom produced by SIP Animation and CinéGroupe. The animated series is a satirical parody of the environmentalist lifestyle epitomized by its title family, which consists of Mom, Pop, Chichi, Lola, and Buba. The show is set in the fictional town of Beauvillage, and lampoons many aspects of the environmental movement, including environmental organizations, animal rights, and pacifism.

Since its debut on September 6, 2004 on Teletoon in Canada, the program has aired twenty-six episodes consisting of fifty-two segments over two seasons.

Premise
Environmental activists Mom and Pop Tofu, concerned that their family is suffocating from urban routine, decide to move to a farmhouse in the town of Beauvillage and embrace a more natural way of life, much to the horror of their pre-teen children, Chichi and Lola. They would rather watch TV and go shopping than amuse themselves with Grandma Buba's animals: Cracker the Rooster, Curly the Sheep, and Suzie the Goat. The siblings must cope with their parents' ecology-friendly world vision and the humiliation that results from their efforts to encourage others to protect the environment.

The neighbourhood that the family settles in is filled with electronically able individuals, contrasting the Tofus' all-organic lifestyle. Unlike her mechanical-genius brother Chichi–who believes in peace within the family–Lola is more cynical and averse to being deemed oddballs in their new home. She occupies herself with her attraction to Billy Hubbub, the boy next door, despite his parents objections.

Characters
Chichi (Aaron Grunfeld)
 Meek but smart. Has a crush on a local teen named Candy. Good friends with Candy and Phil.

Lola (Brigid Tierney)
 Loyal to her brother, best friends with Lily. Has a crush on her neighbour, Billy Hubbub.

Mom (Maria Bircher)
 She's a zen mother trying to keep her house in line.

Pop (Marcel Jeannin)
 He's considered oblivious a lot of the time which ends up proving false since he's usually fairly early in discovering what's going on in his house.  He is also something of a handy-man, as he is often seen inventing machines made of environmentally friendly material, or otherwise run on clean fuel.

Buba (Sonja Ball)
 Lola and Chichi's grandmother. She's the one who grew up in the farm land and it's the life she knows.

April (Jesse Vinet)
 She is a girl who often hangs around the Tofu household. Since her parents work in the emergency ward, she is often left lonely and so grew attached to the more attentive and sincere Tofus. She also developed a quick attraction to Chichi, giving him pet names like 'Chichi honey-bun'.

William "Billy" Hubbub (Daniel Brochu)
 Son of Titus and Beth Hubbub, he's Lola's next door neighbour and biggest all-time crush. The only real thing keeping him from pursuing her is disrupting the families, who will often determine that they don't want the polluter's and the biodegraded's kids together.

Titus Hubbub (Harry Standjofski)
 Master of Alarms, Titus is Billy's father and number one hater of the Tofu family.  He is also their next-door neighbour.

Elizabeth "Beth" Hubbub (Pauline Little)
 She runs the restaurant Burger Palace and this tends to cause a lot of conflict between the families since the Tofus don't like that she uses artificial ingredients.

Phillip "Phil" (Jason Szwimer)
 The neighbour on the other side of the Tofu household. He is Chichi's best friend and confidant.

Lillian "Lily" (Kayla Grunfeld)
 Lola's best friend and confidant. She is a bit quirky, being a hopeless romantic and a boatload of advice.

Cherie (Sarah Allen)
 Lola's rival and the queen bee of her school.

Nicolas "Nick"
 Chichi's rival. The leader of the team of the bullies at Beauvillage.

Susan "Suzie", Cottontail "Curly", Cracker
 Buba's farm animals. Suzie is a goat. Suzie likes to eat everything and accidentally destroys it. Curly is a sheep with a lot of hair. Cracker is a rooster.

Beatrice (Cary Lawrence)

Kris (Michael Yarmush)

Episodes

Season 1: 2004

Season 2: 2005

Production
The Tofus was co-produced by SIP Animation and CinéGroupe. It was directed by Bruno Bianchi, and produced by Bianchi and Danielle Marleau with the assistance of several other executive producers out of Maple Pictures Corp., and scripted by twenty-six writers, including series creators Fabrice de Costil and Bertrand Victor. All the scripts were story edited by Florence Sandis in charge of the script directing. Original music was composed by Alain Garcia and Noam Kaniel.

Each episode of The Tofus was budgeted at US$230,000, and each thirty-minute time block was divided into two fifteen minute-long episodes.

The first episode of France 3's French-language version of The Tofus premiered on January 3, 2005. As Fox Kids Europe was renamed Jetix Europe in July 2004, the program was broadcast under the new brand Jetix when it arrived in other European countries in 2006.

There were five main cast members who voiced The Tofus. Aaron Grunfeld performed the voice of Chichi, while Brigid Tierney performed the voice of Lola. Maria Bircher played Mum, Marcel Jeannin voiced Pop, and Sonja Ball took the role of Buba. Voice direction was overseen by Terrence Scammell.

Development
The show's development was first revealed in April 2002 under the name of Tofu Family, when Saban International Paris (before their renaming to SIP Animation in October) announced that they had pre-sold the series to ITV in the United Kingdom to air on their CITV programming strand, while France 3 was attached as well. The show was originally put into production solely at SIP.

By March 2003, the production for the series was started, and it was confirmed that Teletoon and Fox Kids Europe had joined in the production for the series as well. By June 2003, SIP announced that CinéGroupe in Canada would co-produce the series and that Fox Kids Europe's broadcast deal also included merchandise rights and a first broadcast window on their Fox Kids channels worldwide except in the UK and France, due to the existing deals with ITV and France 3 respectively.

Reception
The Tofus was generally well-received by viewers. It has been called "a modern gloss on the classic family sitcom [that] aptly skewers the granola-munching righteousness of the eco-hippie archetype," and has been commended for its use of ecology as a unique background theme. The Tofus also received top audience ratings among the France 3 Youth Programs in 2005.

See also
 The Goode Family
 The Modern Parents
 What's with Andy?

References

External links
 

2000s French animated television series
2004 French television series debuts
2005 French television series endings
2000s Canadian animated television series
2004 Canadian television series debuts
2005 Canadian television series endings
English-language television shows
French-language television shows
French children's animated comedy television series
Canadian children's animated comedy television series
Environmental television
2000s Canadian satirical television series
New Age in popular culture
Teletoon original programming
French satirical television shows
Animated satirical television series
Animated television series about families
Television series set in the 1990s